Joey Jay is the stage name of Joey Jadryev (born Joseph John Forrest Jadryev; August 14, 1990) an American drag performer most known for competing on season 13 of RuPaul's Drag Race.

Career
Joey Jay performs at Kobalt Bar in Phoenix, Arizona. She competed on season 13 of RuPaul's Drag Race. In May, her nomination was announced at the 2022 WOWIE Awards as part of RuPaul's DragCon in Los Angeles in the category Hottest Hottie Award (The Thirst Follow Award).

Personal life
Joey Jay is openly gay, and lived in Milwaukee before moving to Phoenix in 2017.

Filmography

Television
 RuPaul's Drag Race (season 13)

References

Living people
American drag queens
People from Milwaukee
People from Phoenix, Arizona
RuPaul's Drag Race contestants
Gay entertainers
LGBT people from Wisconsin
LGBT people from Arizona
1990 births